Luling is a census-designated place (CDP) in St. Charles Parish, Louisiana. The population was 11,512 at the 2000 census and 12,119 at the 2010 census. At the 2020 census, 13,716 people lived in Luling.

Geography

Demographics

As of the 2020 United States census, there were 13,716 people, 4,713 households, and 3,767 families residing in the CDP.

At the 2019 American Community Survey, there were 14,049 people living in the community, spread among 4,869 housing units. The racial and ethnic makeup of Luling was 78.2% non-Hispanic white, 15.1% African American, 0.4% American Indian and Alaska Native, 2.2% Asian, 2.2% some other race, and 1.8% from two or more races. The median age was 35.9, and 6.8% of the population were under 5 years of age. The median household income was $89,034; males had a median income of $70,865 versus $48,382 for females. An estimated 9.5% of the population lived at or below the poverty line.

According to the 2000 United States census, there were 11,514 people, 3,899 households, and 3,224 families residing in the CDP. The racial makeup of the CDP was 81.98% White, 15.50% African American, 0.26% Native American, 0.74% Asian, 0.03% Pacific Islander, 0.63% from other races, and 0.87% from two or more races. Hispanic or Latin Americans of any race were 2.69% of the population.

There were 3,899 households, out of which 44.8% had children under the age of 18 living with them, 66.6% were married couples living together, 11.9% had a female householder with no husband present, and 17.3% were non-families. 14.2% of all households were made up of individuals, and 4.9% had someone living alone who was 65 years of age or older. The average household size was 2.92 and the average family size was 3.23.

In the CDP, the population was spread out, with 29.9% under the age of 18, 8.4% from 18 to 24, 30.9% from 25 to 44, 21.6% from 45 to 64, and 9.2% who were 65 years of age or older. The median age was 35 years. For every 100 females, there were 94.0 males. For every 100 females age 18 and over, there were 94.2 males.

The median income for a household in the CDP was $56,114, and the median income for a family was $60,625. Males had a median income of $47,862 versus $26,869 for females. The per capita income for the CDP was $20,439. About 7.0% of families and 8.3% of the population were below the poverty line, including 10.8% of those under age 18 and 12.4% of those age 65 or over.

George Prince tragedy 

Before the Destrehan-Luling Bridge was completed in 1983, connecting the communities of Destrehan and Luling, automobile ferries connected the towns. On October 20, 1976, one of these ferries, the George Prince, was struck by a tanker and capsized as it crossed the Mississippi River. Seventy-eight passengers and crew died.

Education
St. Charles Parish Public School System operates public schools:
Hahnville High School in Boutte
R.K Smith Middle School (grades 6-8) in Luling, opened in 2006
J. B. Martin Middle School (grades 6-8) in Paradis serves the Mimosa/Willowdale portions of Luling
Lakewood Elementary School (grades 3-5) in Luling
Mimosa Park Elementary School (grades K-2) in Luling
Luling Elementary School (grades K-5) in Luling

Events and traditions
Since 1978, Luling has held an annual Krewe of Lul parade on the weekend before Mardi Gras.

The Rotary Club of St. Charles Parish, Louisiana has held an annual Alligator Festival every September since 1980.

The United Way of St. Charles s hosts an annual 5K/10K race over the Hale Boggs Mississippi River Bridge each spring. United Way also holds their annual "Battle For The Paddle", a jambalaya & gumbo cook-off, in the fall.

Notable people
 Darren Barbier - Head football coach at Nicholls State University
 Barbara Colley - romance and mystery writer
 Marques Colston - NFL wide receiver
 Skyler Green - NFL wide receiver
 Chris Markey - College and Professional running back
 Deuce McAllister - NFL running back
 Darius Reynaud - NFL wide receiver

References 

Census-designated places in Louisiana
Census-designated places in St. Charles Parish, Louisiana
Census-designated places in New Orleans metropolitan area
Louisiana populated places on the Mississippi River